Camalú is a town in San Quintín Municipality, Baja California, located on the Pacific Coast of Mexico. The census of 2010 reported a population of 8,621 inhabitants, up from 6,333 in 2000.

Geography
The main town is on Federal Highway 1, 175 km south of Tijuana. Drive time is about 2 hours south of Ensenada, some 30 km past Colonet town.

Though its considerably south of San Diego, water temperatures range from lows nearing 10°C(50°F) to highs approaching 21°C(70°F).  3mm/2mm wetsuits are recommended for surfing on all but the warmest of days.

Tourism
Tourism is important to the local economy, particularly nature and activities tourism, such as surfing, dune racing, and fishing.

Notes

References
Camalú at the Geonet Names Server

Seaside resorts in Baja California
Cities in San Quintín Municipality